Master Series is the title of a line of greatest hits albums, released in European countries primarily by PolyGram International, as well as A&M Records, Deram Records, FFRR Records, Mercury Records, and Polydor Records. In addition, some albums were reissued by Universal Music Group under the Universal Masters Collection and Millennium Edition titles.

Series
Four Master Series series of albums were released: from 1987–1990, 1996–1998, 1998–1999, and from 2003 onwards.

The covers of each series are visually unified:
 1987 series: Black background, "Master Serie" in a sans-serif typeface, the artist's name in a script typeface, a prominent red stripe, and a photo.
 1996 series: Black background, the artist's name in a serif typeface, and a collage of photos.
 1998 series: White background, "Master Series" in a script typeface, the artist's name in a sans-serif typeface, and a photo.
 2003 series: A large photo crossfading into a black background with the artist's name in a serif typeface, and "Master Serie" set against a red glow.

The 1996 series represented various bands in eclectic genres (such as new wave) with relatively small followings, and the 1998 series included hard rock/progressive rock musicians and bands. These series are branded with the international title Master Series. The French title Master série is used to brand the more traditional line with a strong focus on European pop singers, which are frequently issued in multiple volumes. Each subsequent series also reissued some albums from the previous series.

Releases

1987 series 
 Daniel Balavoine Volume 1(1986) – Master Serie
 Daniel Balavoine Volume 2(1992) – Master Serie
 Barbara Volume 1 – Master Serie
 Barbara Volume 2 – Master Serie
 Georges Brassens Volume 1 – Master Serie
 Georges Brassens Volume 2 – Master Serie
 Georges Brassens Volume 3 – Master Serie
 Mike Brant – Master Serie
 Jacques Brel Volume 1 – Master Serie
 Jacques Brel Volume 2 – Master Serie
 Alain Bashung – Master Serie
 Jane Birkin – Master Serie
 Frida Boccara – Master Serie
 Jacques Brel – Master Serie
 Jean-Michel Caradec (1989) – Master Serie
 Christophe – Master Serie
 Dalida Volume 1 – Master Serie
 Dalida Volume 2 – Master Serie
 Michel Delpech – Master Serie
 Jacques Dutronc – Master Serie
 François Feldman (1994) – Master Serie
 Jean Ferrat Volume 1 (1988) – Master Serie
 Jean Ferrat Volume 2 (1990) – Master Serie
 Nino Ferrer – Master Serie
 Claude François Volume 1 – Master Serie
 Claude François Volume 2 – Master Serie
 Serge Gainsbourg – Master Serie
 Daniel Guichard – Master Serie
 Johnny Hallyday Volume 1 – Master Serie
 Johnny Hallyday Volume 2 (1990) – Master Serie
 Jean-Luc Lahaye – Master Serie
 Bernard Lavilliers – Master Serie
 Maxime Le Forestier (1987) – Master Serie
 Guy Marchand – Master Serie
 Melina Mercouri – Master Serie
 Yves Montand – Master Serie
 Nana Mouskouri Volume 1 – Master Serie
 Nana Mouskouri Volume 2 – Master Serie
 Georges Moustaki – Master Serie
 Claude Nougaro Volume 1 – Master Serie
 Claude Nougaro Volume 2 – Master Serie
 Claude Nougaro Volume 3 – Master Serie
 Edith Piaf – Master Serie
 Serge Reggiani – Master Serie
 Renaud – Master Serie
 Nicole Rieu – Master Serie
 Demis Roussos – Master Serie
 William Sheller – Master Serie
 Mort Shuman Volume 1 – Master Serie
 Mort Shuman Volume 2 (1991) – Master Serie
 Yves Simon (1988) – Master Serie
 Alan Stivell (1990) – Master Serie
 Tri Yann(1986) – Master Serie
 Boris Vian – Master Serie

1991 series
 1991 Jimmy Somerville – Master Series

1996 series 
 10cc – Master Series
 1996 ABBA – Master Series
 1997 ABC – Master Series
 Wolfgang Ambros – Master Series
 1997 Joan Armatrading – Master Series
 1996 The Allman Brothers Band – Master Series
 1997 Army of Lovers – Master Series
 1997 Big Country – Master Series
 1997 Burt Bacharach – Master Series
 1996 Bananarama  – Master Series
 1997 Berlin – Master Series
 1998 Maria Bill – Master Series
 1996 Black – Master Series
 Elkie Brooks – Master Series
 1996 Sam Brown – Master Series
 1996 Jimmy Somerville – Master Series (reissue)
 1997 Camel – Master Series
 1998 Peter Cornelius – Master Series
 1996 Dexys Midnight Runners – Master Series
 Yvonne Elliman – Master Series
 1998 Rainhard Fendrich – Master Series
 Bill Haley – Master Series
 1998 Ludwig Hirsch – Master Series
 1997 Joe Jackson – Master Series
 1997 The Jam – Master Series
 1996 Tom Jones – Master Series
 1996 Level 42 – Master Series
 1997 Liza Minnelli – Master Series
 1998 The Moody Blues – Master Series
 Nana Mouskouri – Master Series (reissue)
 1996 The Neville Brothers – Master Series 
 Iggy Pop – Master Series
 Demis Roussos – Master Series (reissue)
 The Rubettes – Master Series
 Scorpions – Master Series
 The Small Faces – Master Series
 1998 Squeeze – Master Series
 STS – Master Series
 Donna Summer – Master Series
 1998 Visage – Master Series
 1998 Waterloo & Robinson – Master Series
 Bruce Willis – Master Series
 1998 Georg Danzer - Master Series
 1998 Kurt Ostbahn - Master Series
 1998 Stefanie Werger - Master Series
 1998 Arik Brauer - Master Series

1998 series 

 1998 ABBA – Master Series (reissue)
 Graeme Allwright – Master Series
 Ange – Master Serie
 Daniel Balavoine – Master Serie (reissue)
 Bananarama – Master Series (reissue)
 Visage – Master Series
 Barbara – Master Serie (reissue)
 1999 Barclay James Harvest – Master Series
 Brigitte Bardot – Master Serie
 The Barron Knights – Master Series
 Acker Bilk – Master Series
 Jane Birkin – Master Serie (reissue)
 Georges Brassens – Master Serie
 Jacques Brel – Master Serie (reissue)
 Roy Buchanan – Master Series
 1999 Kim Carnes – Master Series
 Mirek Černý – Master Serie
 1998 Dio – Master Series
 Jean Ferrat – Master Serie (reissue)
 Serge Gainsbourg – Master Serie (reissue)
 France Gall – Master Serie
 Godley & Creme – Master Series
 Johnny Hallyday – Master Serie (reissue)
 Engelbert Humperdinck – Master Series
 1999 Joe Jackson – Master Series (reissue)
 1998 Tom Jones – Master Series (reissue)
 Kool & the Gang – Master Serie
 Jean-Luc Lahaye – Master Serie (reissue)
 Bernard Lavilliers – Master Serie
 Luna Twist – Master Serie
 Enrico Macias – Master Serie
 The Mamas & the Papas – Master Series
 Guy Marchand – Master Serie (reissue)
 Melina Mercouri – Master Serie (reissue)
 1998 John Miles – Master Series
 Eddy Mitchell – Master Serie
 Jeanne Moreau – Master Serie
 Nana Mouskouri – Master Series (reissue)
 Georges Moustaki – Master Serie
 Nicoletta – Master Serie
 Robert Palmer – Master Series
 Edith Piaf – Master Serie (reissue)
 Pink Fairies – Master Series
 The Platters – Master Series
 Cozy Powell – Master Series
 Renaud – Master Serie
 Serge Reggiani – Master Serie (reissue)
 Nicole Rieu – Master Serie (reissue)
 The Righteous Brothers – Master Series
 Demis Roussos – Master Serie (reissue)
 The Sensational Alex Harvey Band – Master Series
 The Shadows – Master Series
 Mort Shuman – Master Serie
 1998 Status Quo – Master Series
 Alan Stivell – Master Serie (reissue)
 1998 The Style Council – Master Series
 Taxmeni – Master Series
 1998 Thin Lizzy – Master Series
 Hervé Vilard – Master Serie
 1998 Rick Wakeman – Master Series
 Roger Whittaker – Master Series

Millennium Edition reissues 

 Wolfgang Ambros – Millennium Edition
 2000 Joan Armatrading – Millennium Edition
 Burt Bacharach – Millennium Edition
 Black – Millennium Edition
Elkie Brooks - Millennium Edition
 Ludwig Hirsch – Millennium Edition
 John Miles – Millennium Collection

2003 series 

 2003 ABBA – Master Serie (reissue)
 Daniel Balavoine – Master Serie (reissue)
 Barbara – Master Serie (reissue)
 Brigitte Bardot – Master Serie (reissue)
 Gilbert Bécaud – Master Serie
 Jane Birkin – Master Serie (reissue)
 Georges Brassens – Master Serie (reissue)
 Jacques Brel – Master Serie (reissue)
 Jan de Wilde – Master Serie
 Jean Ferrat – Master Serie (reissue)
 Serge Gainsbourg – Master Serie (reissue)
 Kool & the Gang – Master Serie (reissue)
 Bernard Lavilliers – Master Serie (reissue)
 Enrico Macias – Master Serie (reissue)
 Eddy Mitchell – Master Serie (reissue)
 Jeanne Moreau – Master Serie (reissue)
 Nana Mouskouri – Master Serie (reissue)
 Georges Moustaki – Master Serie (reissue)
 Nicoletta – Master Serie (reissue)
 Florent Pagny – Master Serie
 Edith Piaf – Master Serie (reissue)
 Serge Reggiani – Master Serie (reissue)
 Renaud – Master Serie (reissue)
 André Rieu – Master Serie
 Tino Rossi – Master Serie
 Demis Roussos – Master Serie (reissue)
 Michel Sardou – Master Serie
 Alan Stivell – Master Serie (reissue)
 Herve Vilard – Master Serie (reissue)

References

Compilation album series